The Ring magazine was established in 1922 and has named a Round of the Year since 1945, which this list covers. The award is based on the magazine's writers' criteria.

Rounds of the Year by decade

1940s
1945: Willie Joyce vs. Ike Williams, round 12
1946: Tony Zale vs. Rocky Graziano, round 6
1947: Joe Louis vs. Jersey Joe Walcott, round 4
1948: Joe Louis vs. Jersey Joe Walcott II, round 11
1949: Rocky Graziano vs. Charley Fusari, round 10

1950s
1950: Jake LaMotta vs. Laurent Dauthuille II, round 15
1951: Rocky Marciano vs. Joe Louis, round 8
1952: Rocky Marciano vs. Jersey Joe Walcott, round 13
1953: Kid Gavilán vs. Carmen Basilio, round 2
1954: Archie Moore vs. Harold Johnson V, round 14
1955: Archie Moore vs. Bobo Olson, round 3
1956: Sugar Ray Robinson vs. Bobo Olson IV, round 4
1957: Sugar Ray Robinson vs. Gene Fullmer II, round 5
1958: Ingemar Johansson vs. Eddie Machen, round 1
1959: Ingemar Johansson vs. Floyd Patterson, round 3

1960s
1960: Floyd Patterson vs. Ingemar Johansson II, round 5
1961: Floyd Patterson vs. Ingemar Johansson III, round 1
1962: Sonny Liston vs. Floyd Patterson, round 1
1963: Sonny Liston vs. Floyd Patterson II, round 1
1964: José Torres vs. Bobo Olson, round 1
1965: José Torres vs. Willie Pastrano, round 6
1966: Carlos Ortiz vs. Sugar Ramos, round 5
1967: Dick Tiger vs. Roger Rouse, round 12
1968: Bob Foster vs. Dick Tiger, round 4
1969: Nino Benvenuti vs. Luis Manuel Rodríguez, round 11

1970s
1970: Muhammad Ali vs. Oscar Bonavena, round 15
1971: Joe Frazier vs. Muhammad Ali, round 15
1972: Muhammad Ali vs. Bob Foster, round 5
1973: George Foreman vs. Joe Frazier, round 2
1974: Muhammad Ali vs. George Foreman, round 8
1975: Muhammad Ali vs. Joe Frazier III, round 12
1976: George Foreman vs. Ron Lyle, rounds 4 and 5
1977: Jimmy Young vs. George Foreman, round 12
1978: Leon Spinks vs. Muhammad Ali, round 15
1979: Matthew Franklin vs. Marvin Johnson, round 8

1980s
1980: Matthew Saad Muhamad vs. Yaqui López, round 8
1981: William "Caveman" Lee vs. John LoCicero, round 5
1982: Wilfredo Gómez vs. Lupe Pintor, round 3
1983: Larry Holmes vs. Tim Witherspoon, round 9
1984: Juan Meza vs. Jaime Garza, round 1
1985: Marvin Hagler vs. Thomas Hearns, round 1
1986: Steve Cruz vs. Barry McGuigan, round 15
1987: Kelvin Seabrooks vs. Thierry Jacob, round 1
1988: Mike Tyson vs. Michael Spinks, round 1
1989: Lupe Gutierrez vs. Jeff Franklin, round 12

1990s
1990: Aaron Davis vs. Mark Breland, round 9
1991: no award given
1992: Riddick Bowe vs. Evander Holyfield, round 10
1993: Terry Norris vs. Troy Waters, round 2
1994: Jorge Castro vs. John David Jackson, round 9
1995: Saman Sorjaturong vs. Humberto González, round 7
1996: Frankie Liles vs. Tim Littles, round 3
1997: Arturo Gatti vs. Gabriel Ruelas, round 5
1998: Ivan Robinson vs. Arturo Gatti II, round 3
1999: Oscar De La Hoya vs. Ike Quartey, round 6

2000s
2000: Érik Morales vs. Marco Antonio Barrera, round 5
2001: Bernard Hopkins vs. Félix Trinidad, round 10
2002: Micky Ward vs. Arturo Gatti, round 9
2003: Acelino Freitas vs. Jorge Rodrigo Barrios, round 11
2004: Érik Morales vs. Marco Antonio Barrera III, round 11
2005: Diego Corrales vs. José Luis Castillo, round 10
2006: Somsak Sithchatchawal vs. Mahyar Monshipour, round 10
2007: Israel Vázquez vs. Rafael Márquez II, round 3
2008: Israel Vázquez vs. Rafael Márquez III, round 4
2009: Marcos Maidana vs. Victor Ortiz, round 1

2010s
2010: Juan Manuel López vs. Bernabe Concepcion, round 1
2011: James Kirkland vs. Alfredo Angulo, round 1
2012: Juan Manuel Márquez vs. Manny Pacquiao IV, round 5
2013: Timothy Bradley vs. Ruslan Provodnikov, round 6
2014: Tommy Coyle vs. Daniel Brizuela, round 11
2015: Amir Imam vs. Fidel Maldonado, round 3
2016: Skender Halili vs. Jason Thompson, round 2
2017: Dominic Breazeale vs. Izu Ugonoh, round 3
2018: Deontay Wilder vs. Tyson Fury, round 12
2019: Andy Ruiz Jr. vs. Anthony Joshua, round 3

2020s
2020: Jose Zepeda vs. Ivan Baranchyk, round 5
2021: Tyson Fury vs. Deontay Wilder III, round 4
2022: Sebastian Fundora vs. Erickson Lubin, round 7

References

External links

Boxing awards
Round of the year